Priay is a commune in the Ain department in the Auvergne-Rhône-Alpes region of eastern France. People from Priay are known as Priaysiens.

Population

See also
Communes of the Ain department

References

Communes of Ain
Ain communes articles needing translation from French Wikipedia